Mark Edward Arneson (born September 9, 1949) is a former American Football linebacker. His brother Jim Arneson followed him into the NFL.

College career
Arneson graduated from the University of Arizona, and was later named to their sports Hall of Fame (1976). Arneson is currently ranked top 10 in two stat lines at the University of Arizona still; 10th in Career Total Tackles (357), 8th in Career Assisted Tackles (171). He led the team in assisted tackles in 1969 and 1970, and led them in unassisted tackles in 1970. He was also a two-time first-team All-WAC selection (1970, 1971).

Pro career
Arneson was selected by the St. Louis Cardinals in the second round of the 1972 NFL Draft. He missed only five games during his nine seasons in St. Louis. One of his career highlights came on his birthday in 1979 when he returned a fumble for a touchdown against the New York Giants. Arneson retired after the 1980 season.

References

St. Louis Cardinals (football) players
Arizona Wildcats football players
1949 births
Living people